Champagne Thiénot is a Champagne house founded in 1985 and based in Taissy, near from Reims. It is part of the Alain Thiénot Group, owner of different brands such as Canard-Duchêne, Joseph Perrier and Marie Stuart.

Vineyards

Vineyards spanning 27 hectares, of which half are classified as Grand Cru and Premier Cru:

 Grand Cru (6.25 Ha) : Ay, Le Mesnil et Avize
 1er Cru (7.01 Ha) : Dizy, Cumières, Pierry et Tauxière

See also
 List of Champagne houses

References

External links
 Official website

Champagne producers